The Government of Zamboanga City, also known as the Zamboanga City Government is the local government unit in-charge of the City of Zamboanga. It is a mayor-council form of government supervised directly by the President of the Philippines and the Secretary of the Interior and Local Government.

The city government has three interdependent branches: the legislative branch, the executive branch, and the judicial branch. The powers of the branches are vested by the 1991 Local Government Code of the Philippines in the following: 
Local legislative power is vested in a unicameral Sangguniang Panglungsod with the vice-mayor as its presiding officer.
Local executive power is exercised by the government under the leadership of the City Mayor. 
Local judicial power is vested in the Regional Trial Court and lower courts.

Legislative department

The legislative power of the city is vested in the unicameral Sangguniang Panglungsod. It is composed of:
the Vice Mayor as its presiding officer elected citywide;
eight (8) councilors representing two of the city legislative districts which are elected for a term of three (3) years;
Chairman of the Liga ng mga Barangay of the city as ex officio member; and
President of the Pederasyon ng mga Sangguniang Kabataan of the city as ex officio member.

The elected members can be re-elected but they may not run for a fourth consecutive term.

When a vacancy arises in the Sanggunian, the President of the Philippines shall appoint to fill in the vacancy. In case of vacancy in the representation of the youth and the barangay in the Sanggunian, the said vacancy shall be filled automatically by the official next in rank of the organization concerned.

Executive department

The executive power is vested in the Mayor. The current executive branch is headed by Mayor John M. Dalipe of the Lakas CMD. The mayor is elected by popular vote to a term of three years. The mayor can be re-elected but may not run for a fourth consecutive term.

The second highest official, Vice Mayor Josephine Pareja is also elected by popular vote. The Vice Mayor is first in line to succession if the office of the Mayor is vacant. The vice mayor is the presiding officer of the Sangguniang Panglungsod.

The mayor's assistant's as required by the 1991 Local Government Code are:
City Treasurer
City Accountant
City Budget Officer
City Planning and Development Coordinator
City Engineer
City Health Officer
City Civil Registrar
City Administrator
City Legal Officer
City Veterinarian
City Social Welfare and Development Officer
City General Services Officer
As optional by the 1991 Local Government Code:
City Architect
City Information Officer
City Agriculturist
City Population Officer
City Environment and Natural Resources Officer
City Cooperatives Officer

Historical governments

Republic of Zamboanga
The Republic of Zamboanga's declared sovereignty lasted from May 18, 1899 until November 16, 1899, wherein its revolutionary government and chosen President, Vicente Álvarez, who led the liberation of the Zamboangueños from the tenuous grip of the retreating Spanish military, along with his victorious troops, exercised de facto sovereignty over administrative functions and military control within their new country territory and was not subordinate or subject to any other government or authority in the Philippines.

Álvarez proclaimed his new Republic of Zamboanga had rule over the entire islands of Mindanao, Basilan, and Sulu - effectively the entire southern Philippines. His claim was grandiose. In reality, the republic's sovereignty extended only over the existing premises of ancient Zamboanga, which can be estimated to be about the same size as present-day Zamboanga City is.

Presidents of the Republic

Under Moro Province

In March 1903, Arquiza's government ended and was replaced by a new U.S. governor, also effectively ending the Republic of Zamboanga.

Zamboanga is made capital of consolidated Mindanao, Basilan, and Sulu Archipelago after abolition of the Republic. The Moro Province had 5 districts: Sulu, Zamboanga, Lanao, Cotabato, and Davao.

City mayors

On recommendation of Governor John J. Pershing, the Legislative Council of the Moro Province passed on September 15, 1911, Act No. 272, converting the municipality of Zamboanga into a city with a commission form of government. Its municipal board consisted of a mayor and two commissioners.

On February 26, 1937, the City Charter of Zamboanga became effective and the new city government was inaugurated headed by a mayor appointed by the President of the Philippine Commonwealth.

With the passage of Republic Act No. 1210 on April 29, 1955, the position of mayor became elective and the post of vice-mayor was created.

Note: The first column consecutively numbers the individuals who have served as chief executive (either mayor or municipal president) of Zamboanga City, while the second column consecutively numbers the individuals who have served as city mayor.

Municipal presidents
When the Department of Mindanao and Sulu replaced the Moro Province in 1914, the city was reverted to municipality status under the supervision of the province of Zamboanga.

Note: The first column consecutively numbers the individuals who have served as chief executive (either mayor or municipal president) of Zamboanga City, while the second column consecutively numbers the individuals who have served as municipal president.

Zamboanga City officials since 2007

2007–2010

2010–2013

2013–2016

2016–2019

2019–2022

2022–2025

2022 Zamboanga City local elections
Local elections were held in Zamboanga City on 9 May 2022, within the Philippine general election. The voters elected for the elective local posts in the city: the mayor, vice mayor, and eight councilors per district.

References

Local government in Zamboanga City